Crawford Township, Ohio, may refer to:

Crawford Township, Coshocton County, Ohio
Crawford Township, Wyandot County, Ohio

Ohio township disambiguation pages